Allium filidens is a species of onion found at high elevations of central and south-central Asia. It is a bulb-forming perennial up to 45 cm tall, forming a hemispherical umbel of flowers; tepals white or pink with a purple midvein.

Subspecies
Allium filidens subsp. filidens - Pakistan, Afghanistan, Kyrgyzstan, Uzbekistan, Tajikistan, Kazakhstan
Allium filidens subsp. mogianense R.M.Fritsch & F.O.Khass. - Tajikistan
Allium filidens subsp. ugami (Vved.) R.M.Fritsch & F.O.Khass. - Tajikistan

References

filidens
Onions
Flora of Central Asia
Plants described in 1875